Menko Victor (Pek) van Andel, known as a ‘serendipitiologist', got his university degree in medical research in Groningen, where he developed, with the internationally known and inventive ophthalmologist Jan Worst, among other things, an artificial cornea as a treatment for blindness.

In 2000, Van Andel won the satirical Ig Nobel Prize for medicine (for ‘improbable research’ that makes people laugh and then think) for the iconoclastic and classic MRI scans of human sexual intercourse, published in the British Medical Journal and inspired by fMRI scans of the larynx of someone singing.

Van Andel was one of the first researchers to study and extract serendipity patterns for accidental unsought knowledge discovery. He published an influential paper titled 'Anatomy of the unsought finding' in the British Journal for the Philosophy of Science. In 2015 Van Andel gave a TEDx talk about that topic.

References

1944 births
Living people
Dutch medical researchers
Dutch ophthalmologists
People from Haarlemmermeer
University of Groningen alumni